The 1974 Central Michigan Chippewas football team was an American football team that represented Central Michigan University as an independent during the 1974 NCAA Division II football season. In their eighth season under head coach Roy Kramer, the Chippewas compiled a 12–1 record, losing the opening game to Kent State and then winning 12 straight games.

In postseason play, they defeated Boise State 20–6 at Perry Shorts Stadium in a Division II quarterfinal, Louisiana Tech  in the Pioneer Bowl (semifinal) in Texas, and Delaware  in the Camellia Bowl to win the Division II championship. The team was also later voted number one in the AP's "College Division" poll.

The 1974 Chippewas held 11 of their 13 opponents to 14 or fewer points and outscored all opponents by a combined total of 450 to 127. The team played its home games in Perry Shorts Stadium in Mount Pleasant, Michigan, with attendance of 93,236 in six home games.

The team's statistical leaders included quarterback Mike Franckowiak with 1,262 passing yards (81 of 149 passing), running back Walt Hodges with 1,463 rushing yards (251 carries), and Matt Means with 848 receiving yards (55 receptions). Hodges' 1,463 rushing yards was a Central Michigan record at that time. Franckowiak received the team's most valuable player award.

After the 1974 season, Central Michigan jumped to Division I and joined the Mid-American Conference. In 2004, the 1974 team was inducted as a group into the Central Michigan University Hall of Fame.

Schedule

Roster

NFL Draft
The following players were drafted into the National Football League following the season.

See also
 1974 in Michigan

References

Central Michigan
Central Michigan Chippewas football seasons
NCAA Division II Football Champions
NCAA Small College Football Champions
Central Michigan Chippewas football